The North Pacific Coast Railroad (NPC) was a common carrier  narrow-gauge steam railroad begun in 1874 and sold in 1902 to new owners who renamed it the North Shore Railroad (California) (NSR) and which rebuilt the southern section into a standard-gauge electric railway.

The NPC operated in the northern California counties of Marin and Sonoma that carried redwood lumber, local dairy and agricultural products, express and passengers. The NPC operated almost  of track that extended from a pier at Sausalito (which connected the line via ferry to San Francisco) and operated northwest to Duncans Mills and Cazadero (also known as Ingrams). The NPC became the North Shore Railroad (California) (NSR) on March 7, 1902. In 1907 the North Shore Railroad became part of the Northwestern Pacific Railroad (NWP). Southern portions of the line were standard gauged and electrified by the North Shore for suburban passenger service, though tracks north of Point Reyes Station remained  narrow gauge until abandonment in the late 1930s.

Route

Mileposts conform to Southern Pacific Railroad convention of distance from San Francisco:
San Francisco – Sausalito via Ferry
Sausalito (milepost 6.5)
San Rafael
Junction (later known as San Anselmo) (milepost 16.5)
Fairfax (milepost 18.3)
Point Reyes Station (milepost 36.4)
Marshall (milepost 45.4)
Tomales (milepost 53.1)
Valley Ford (milepost 59.5)
Freestone (milepost 63.7)
Occidental (milepost 67.6)
Monte Rio (milepost 73.8)
Duncans Mills (milepost 77.1)
Cazadero (milepost 84.3)

Subsequent to abandonment, a  segment around Samuel P. Taylor State Park was converted into a rail trail: the Cross Marin Trail. It includes a segment in Tocaloma as well as the bridge over Lagunitas Creek and Sir Francis Drake Boulevard.

Electrification

The NSR was operated by John Martin and Eugene de Sabla Jr., pioneers in the electric railroad business. The southern  of line were modernized to allow operation of standard-gauge electric passenger cars in addition to narrow-gauge steam-powered freight trains. Electric cars sometimes shared dual-gauge tracks with the steam trains, while at other locations a separate track for the electric cars was constructed parallel to the narrow-gauge route.  The line was ultimately double tracked from Sausalito to San Anselmo except for the tunnel at Alto. A power house was built at Alto and power was also purchased at San Rafael. Direct current electrical power was transmitted to the trains at 600 volts by a third rail (which was actually a fourth rail on the dual-gauge segments.) Service started to Mill Valley on August 20, 1903, and to San Rafael on October 17, 1903. It was the first United States steam railroad electrified for operational efficiency rather than for smoke abatement. The railroad established practices later used in Grand Central Terminal and the interborough subways of New York City. The electric lines were expanded after 1907 as part of the Northwestern Pacific Railroad. Interurban services ceased on February 28, 1941.

Locomotives

Roster of electric cars

Ferries

 Lagunitas, launched 31 January 1903 from the W. A. Boole & Son shipyard in Oakland

Remains
All of the NPC trackage has been abandoned either by the NPC or the NWP. Some of the original right of way can be seen at the Samuel P. Taylor State Park near Fairfax, and along the shores of Tomales Bay and Keyes Estuary. Former stations remain in San Anselmo, Duncans Mills, and Point Reyes Station. The wooden water tank and a freight shed are maintained and in good condition at Freestone.

One NPC steam locomotive, No.12 the "Sonoma," remains as a restored static exhibit in its circa 1870s appearance at the California State Railroad Museum in Sacramento. A flatcar, North Shore 1725, has been restored as a picnic car and operates at the Society for the Preservation of Carter Railroad Resources' Railroad Museum at Ardenwood in Fremont. Several former railroad cars are located at Duncans Mills; one, a former passenger coach, was used as the Point Reyes Station library beginning in 1931.

References

Notes

External links

PacificNG.com: North Pacific Coast Railroad
Society for the Preservation of Carter Railroad Resources: Flatcar NS 1725

Defunct California railroads
Narrow gauge railroads in California
3 ft gauge railways in the United States
History of Marin County, California
History of Sonoma County, California
Predecessors of the Northwestern Pacific Railroad
Predecessors of the Southern Pacific Transportation Company
Public transportation in Marin County, California
Transportation in Marin County, California
Transportation in Sonoma County, California
Sausalito, California
West Marin
Railway companies established in 1871
1871 establishments in California
Railway companies disestablished in 1902
1902 disestablishments in California
Tiburon, California
Mill Valley, California
Interurban railways in California
600 V DC railway electrification